The year 1733 in architecture involved some significant events.

Buildings and structures

Buildings

Clandon Park (Surrey), designed by Giacomo Leoni, completed.
Trafalgar House (Wiltshire) completed.
St John Horsleydown and St Luke Old Street in London, both designed by Nicholas Hawksmoor and John James, are completed for the Commission for Building Fifty New Churches.
Wade's Bridge, Aberfeldy, Scotland, designed by William Adam, built.
Ludwigsburg Palace is completed.

Births
 January 4 – Robert Mylne, Scottish architect (died 1811)

Deaths
 December 7 – Edward Lovett Pearce, Irish palladian architect (born 1699)

References

Architecture
Years in architecture
18th-century architecture